Asian Highway 68 (AH68) is a road in the Asian Highway Network running 278 km (174 miles) from Jinghe, Xinjiang, China to Usharal, Kazakhstan connecting AH5 to AH60. The route is as follows:

China
 : Jinghe - Alataw Pass

Kazakhstan
 A7 Highway: Dostyk - Usharal

Asian Highway Network
Roads in Kazakhstan
Roads in China
Roads in Xinjiang